April Evans is an American soprano who has sung with the Opera Orchestra of New York where she sang Irene in Wagner's Rienzi in 1983 and with the Teater Kiel in Germany where she was the soprano soloist in Beethoven's Missa solemnis (1986) and Rainer Kunad's Thomas-Evangelium (1987). She also appeared in a concert performance of Franchetti's rarely performed opera Germania with Bel Canto Opera (New York City, 1985).

Awards
Pavarotti International Voice Competition, winner

References

External links
 
 Official Youtube channel

Living people
American operatic sopranos
Year of birth missing (living people)
21st-century American women